3D Manufacturing Format or 3MF is an open source file format standard developed and published by the 3MF Consortium.

3MF is an XML-based data format designed specifically for additive manufacturing. It includes information about materials, colors, and other information that cannot be represented in the STL format. 3MF is part of the Linux open standards project and is not intended to compete in the traditional CAD space which are represented by neutral formats.

Today, CAD software related companies such as Autodesk, Dassault Systèmes, PTC, and Netfabb are part of the 3MF Consortium. Other firms in the 3MF Consortium are Microsoft (for operating system and 3D modeling support), SLM and HP, whilst Shapeways are also included to give insight from a 3D printing background. Other key players in the 3D printing and additive manufacturing business, such as Materialise, 3D Systems, Siemens Digital Industries Software and Stratasys have recently joined the consortium. To facilitate the adoption, 3MF Consortium has brought on new associate members and Executive Director to increase awareness and adoption while also published a C++ implementation of the 3MF file format.

Features
Below are a list of some of the advantages of the 3MF format, supplied by the consortium.
 Full color and texture support in a single file
 Support structures attached to part data
 Full tray support for direct machine preparation
 Thumbnails, viewing, and printing in Microsoft Windows
 Multiple material support
 Beam extension for complex lattice structures
 Slice extension for machine data
 Secure end to end encryption
 Volumetric communication of data at voxel level
 Designed for industrial manufacturing
 Native integration in Microsoft Office and Paint 3D

Sample file

Below is the 3D payload for a simple 3MF file describing a rectangular cuboid, adapted from the 3MF Core specification. The rectangular cuboid has the dimensions of a 1-2-3 block.

<?xml version="1.0" encoding="UTF-8"?>
<model unit="inch"
       xml:lang="en-US"
       xmlns="http://schemas.microsoft.com/3dmanufacturing/core/2015/02">
	<metadata name="Copyright">
		Copyright (c) 2015 3MF Consortium. All rights reserved.
	</metadata>
	<resources>
		<object id="1" type="model">
			<mesh>
				<vertices>
		          		<vertex x="0" y="0" z="0" />
		          		<vertex x="1" y="0" z="0" />
		          		<vertex x="1" y="2" z="0" />
		          		<vertex x="0" y="2" z="0" />
		     			<vertex x="0" y="0" z="3" />
		          		<vertex x="1" y="0" z="3" />
		          		<vertex x="1" y="2" z="3" />
		          		<vertex x="0" y="2" z="3" />
				</vertices>
				<triangles>
		          		<triangle v1="3" v2="2" v3="1" />
		          		<triangle v1="1" v2="0" v3="3" />
		          		<triangle v1="4" v2="5" v3="6" />
		          		<triangle v1="6" v2="7" v3="4" />
		          		<triangle v1="0" v2="1" v3="5" />
		          		<triangle v1="5" v2="4" v3="0" />
		          		<triangle v1="1" v2="2" v3="6" />
		          		<triangle v1="6" v2="5" v3="1" />
		          		<triangle v1="2" v2="3" v3="7" />
		          		<triangle v1="7" v2="6" v3="2" />
		          		<triangle v1="3" v2="0" v3="4" />
		          		<triangle v1="4" v2="7" v3="3" />
				</triangles>
			</mesh>
		</object>
	</resources>
	<build>
		<item objectid="1" />
	</build>
</model>

3MF Consortium Members 

 Autodesk
 HP
 3D Systems
 Dassault Systems
 EOS
 Hexagon
 Materialise
 Microsoft
 nTopology
 Prusa
 PTC
 Siemens
 SLM
 Stratasys
 Ultimaker
 Viaccess.Orca

See also
 3D printing marketplace
 Open XML Paper Specification
 X3D
 Additive Manufacturing File Format
 glTF File Format

References

Open formats
XML-based standards
3D graphics file formats
CAD file formats